Poverty is measured in different ways by different bodies, both governmental and nongovernmental. Measurements can be absolute, which references a single standard, or relative, which is dependent on context. Poverty is widely understood to be multidimensional, comprising social, natural and economic factors situated within wider socio-political processes. The capabilities approach argues that capturing the perceptions of poor people is fundamental to understanding poverty.

The main poverty line used in the OECD and the European Union is a relative poverty measure based on 60% of the median household income. The United States uses an absolute poverty measure based on the U.S. Department of Agriculture's "economy food plan", adjusted for inflation. The World Bank also defines poverty in absolute terms. It defines extreme poverty as living on less than US$1.90 per day. (PPP), and moderate poverty as less than $3.10 a day. 

It has been estimated that in 2008, 1.4 billion people had consumption levels below US$1.25 a day and 2.7 billion lived on less than $2 a day.

Absolute vs relative poverty
When measured, poverty may be absolute or relative. Absolute poverty refers to a set standard which is consistent over time and between countries. An example of an absolute measurement would be the percentage of the population eating less food than is required to sustain the human body (approximately 2000–2500 calories per day).

Relative poverty, in contrast, views poverty as socially defined and dependent on social context. One relative measurement would be to compare the total wealth of the poorest one-third of the population with the total wealth of the richest 1% of the population. In this case, the number of people counted as poor could increase while their income rises. There are several different income inequality metrics; one example is the Gini coefficient.

Although absolute poverty is more common in developing countries, poverty and inequality exist across the world.

Measurements
The main poverty line used in the OECD and the European Union is a relative poverty measure based on "economic distance", a level of income usually set at 60% of the median household income.

The United States, in contrast, uses an absolute poverty measure. The US poverty line was created in 1963–64 and was based on the dollar costs of the U.S. Department of Agriculture's "economy food plan" multiplied by a factor of three. The multiplier was based on research showing that food costs then accounted for about one-third of money income. This one-time calculation has since been annually updated for inflation.

The U.S. line has been critiqued as being either too high or too low. For example, the Heritage Foundation, a conservative U.S. think tank, objects to the fact that, according to the U.S. Census Bureau, 46% of those defined as being in poverty in the U.S. own their own home (with the average poor person's home having three bedrooms, with one and a half baths, and a garage). Others, such as economist Ellen Frank, argue that the poverty measure is too low as families spend much less of their total budget on food than they did when the measure was established in the 1950s. Further, federal poverty statistics do not account for the widely varying regional differences in non-food costs such as housing, transport, and utilities.

Both absolute and relative poverty measures are usually based on a person's yearly income and frequently take no account of total wealth. Some people argue that this ignores a key component of economic well-being. Major developments and research in this area suggest that standard one dimensional measures of poverty, based mainly on wealth or calorie consumption, are seriously deficient. This is because poverty often  involves being deprived on several fronts, which do not necessarily correlate well with wealth. Access to basic needs is an example of a measurement that does not include wealth. Access to basic needs that may be used in the measurement of poverty are clean water, food, shelter, and clothing.  It has been established that people may have enough income to satisfy basic needs, but not use it wisely. Similarly, extremely poor people may not be deprived if sufficiently strong social networks, or social service systems exist. For deeper discussion see. See also the Wikipedia article on Multidimensional poverty.

Indicator income 
Benefits:

 Easy to measure (normally less incomes than expenditure)
 Measures degree control over finance of household
 Cheaper collecting of data
.. Help in the allocation of resources by the government

Disadvantages:

 Probably income will be underreported
 May be affected by short-term fluctuations (for example, the seasonal works), so reporting period might not catch right information
 Some parts of income are hard to survey (self-home production or self-employment income)
 Link between income and welfare can be confusing

Indicator expenditure 
Benefits:

 Report actual material standard of living. 
 For long term measuring is better and more precisely
 Less understated so expenditures are easier to recall

Disadvantages:

 Consumption of household could be unevenly (for example borrowing money)
 Consumption choices couldn't be rational. People who spend less, could save or live humbly
 Data could be damaged, because of untruly information
 Difficult to measure durable goods in some period of research.

Other Measures of Household Welfare 
Even if income and expenses are measured perfectly, none of these measures show well-being objectively. For example, it includes leisure, public goods, health care, education and even peace and security. One criterion is the consumption of calories per person. According to this criterion, we can see what percentage of the population suffers from hunger. Although the average limit is around 2,100 calories, it still varies from person to person. It depends on age, gender, etc. What percentage of income do we spend on food consumption? Research shows that the more developed a country, the smaller the budget we spend on food. The disadvantage of this scale is that people differ relatively in the quality of food and it is consumption per person. Measuring results rather than inputs. Rather than the amount of food, we should focus on the anthropometric state (underweight, etc.). This measurement really shows the quality of the household. However, it cannot be used for comparisons between states or continents, because nationalities differ in scale. The last idea of how to assess poverty is up to the decision among citizens. In Vietnam, for example, some villages are judged by the people themselves, who need help out of poverty. Although this simple solution works somewhere, it is very often distorted by various influences. In short, there is as yet no ideal measure for the well-being of the population. This is not an argument to end the measurement, but rather a warning to minimize errors and take into account as many factors as possible.

Definitions
The World Bank defines poverty in absolute terms. The bank defines extreme poverty as living on less than US$1.90 per day. (PPP), and moderate poverty as less than $3.10 a day. It has been estimated that in 2008, 1.4 billion people had consumption levels below US$1.25 a day and 2.7 billion lived on less than $2 a day. The proportion of the developing world's population living in extreme economic poverty has fallen from 28 percent in 1990 to 21 percent in 2001. Much of the improvement has occurred in East and South Asia. In Sub-Saharan Africa GDP/capita shrank with 14 percent, and extreme poverty increased from 41 percent in 1981 to 46 percent in 2001. Other regions have seen little or no change. In the early 1990s the transition economies of Europe and Central Asia experienced a sharp drop in income. Poverty rates rose to 6 percent at the end of the decade before beginning to recede. There are criticisms of these measurements.

Non-monetary indicators
Some economists, such as Guy Pfeffermann, say that other non-monetary indicators of "absolute poverty" are also improving. Life expectancy has greatly increased in the developing world since World War II and is starting to close the gap to the developed world where the improvement has been smaller. Even in Sub-Saharan Africa, the least developed region, life expectancy increased from 30 years before World War II to a peak of about 50 years — before the HIV pandemic and other diseases started to force it down to the current level of 47 years. Child mortality has decreased in every developing region of the world. The proportion of the world's population living in countries where per-capita food supplies are less than 2,200 calories (9,200 kilojoules) per day decreased from 56% in the mid-1960s to below 10% by the 1990s. Between 1950 and 1999, global literacy increased from 52% to 81% of the world. Women made up much of the gap: Female literacy as a percentage of male literacy has increased from 59% in 1970 to 80% in 2000. The percentage of children not in the labor force has also risen to over 90% in 2000 from 76% in 1960. There are similar trends for electric power, cars, radios, and telephones per capita, as well as the proportion of the population with access to clean water.

Headcount index 
Headcount index (Po) is a widely-used measure, which simply indicates the proportion of the poor population. Although it does not indicate how poor the poor are.

Formula: , where Np is the number of poor and N is the total population.

Example: If 10 people are poor in a survey that samples 1000 people, then Po = 10/1000 = 0.01 = 1%

Its often helpful to rewrite:

 , Here, I(·) is an indicator function that takes on a value of 1 if the bracketed expression is true, and 0 otherwise. So if expenditure (yi) is less than the poverty line (z), then I(·) equals 1 and the household would be counted as poor. 

This index is easy to understand, but has few disadvantages. It does not show the poverty rate. In addition, the headcount index does not show how poor the poor are. Moreover, this estimate is made on households and not on individuals.

Poverty gap index 

The Poverty gap index is the mean distance below the poverty line as a proportion of the poverty line where the mean is taken over the whole population, counting the non-poor as having zero poverty gap.

Using the index function, we have: , where define the poverty gap (Gi) as the poverty line (z) less actual income (yi) for poor individuals; the gap is considered to be zero for everyone else.

Could be rewrite:  

This method is only reasonable if the transfers could be made perfectly efficiently, what is unlikely.

Sen index 
The Sen index connects the number of poor with the size of their poverty and the distribution of poverty in the sample.

Sen-Shorrocks-Thon Index 
The Sen-Shorrocks-Thon index (sometimes referred to as SST index) is an improved version of the Sen index.

Common survey problems 
These surveys interpret data that has some common problems:

Random sample: All research is based on randomly selecting people into a sample, and each should have the same chance of being selected. Unfortunately, it is not easy for the sample not to be biased, because some groups of people are simply difficult to trace.

Sampling: We can see inequalities from experience and from surveys themselves. Surveys show us only an estimated formula. Another thing we should be interested in is how the sampling was performed. In areas with dense population, there is usually under-sampling.

Goods Coverage and Valuation: To cover and refine the information, we should ask the sample more generally. Not only the issues of income and expenditure are enough, but also own consumption from the family farm. It is necessary to gather information on housing and components of durable consumption.

Variability and the Time Period of Measurement: Income, consumption and other factors change over time. In less developed countries, therefore, the focus is only on consumption, which is more stable from income.

Comparisons across Households at Similar Consumption Levels: Comparisons between households are difficult because households differ not only in the size of income and expenditure, but also in the environment, leisure, quality of the environment, etc.

Stats
Even if poverty may be lessening for the world as a whole, it continues to be an enormous problem:
 One third of deaths — some 18 million people a year or 50,000 per day — are due to poverty-related causes. That's 270 million people since 1990, the majority women and children, roughly equal to the population of the US.	 
 Every year nearly 11 million children die before their fifth birthday.
In 2001, 1.1 billion people had consumption levels below $1 a day and 2.7 billion lived on less than $2 a day.
 800 million people go to bed hungry every day.

Other factors
The World Bank's Voices of the Poor initiative, based on research with over 20,000 poor people in 23 countries, identifies a range of factors that poor people consider elements of poverty. Most important are those necessary for material well-being, especially food. Many others relate to social rather than material issues.
precarious livelihoods
excluded locations
gender relationships

References

External links 
Graph of poverty line across E.U. countries
Poverty line definition at OECD
 A map of world poverty
 

Measurements and definitions of poverty
Development economics
Injustice